This is a list of Estonian television related events from 1981.

Events

Debuts

Television shows

Ending this year

Births
26 February - Märt Avandi, actor, TV host, and comedian
26 May - Eda-Ines Etti, singer and TV host
15 June - Veljo Reinik, actor

Deaths